The Suzuki V-Strom 1000, also known as the DL1000, is a dual-sport motorcycle  with a 996 cc V-twin engine and a standard riding posture. It has been manufactured in Japan by Suzuki since 2002, although sales in Europe ended in 2009.
The name V-Strom combines "V" referring to the bike's engine configuration with the German Strom, meaning stream or power.

The V-Strom motorcycle is based on the V-twin engine initially designed for the Suzuki TL1000S and TL1000R motorcycles.  It incorporates design elements from other Suzuki motorcycles including fuel injection based on the GSX-R models. A smaller-engined version, V-Strom 650 is also manufactured.

Since 2020, Suzuki has started manufacturing the replacement for the DL1000, the Suzuki V-Strom 1050 and V-Strom 1050XT. Suzuki has completely redesigned the motorcycle, though the engine remained mainly the same, except for some changes to comply to Euro5 emission standards.

Kawasaki marketed an identical version of the bike named the KLV1000 in Europe.

Model year changes 

2003 (K3) Added fork pre-load adjusters. Alternator output increased from 350 watts to 400 watts. New clutch slave cylinder dust cover, later production models.

2004 (K4) Redesigned instrument cluster. Upgrade 16-bit to 32-bit ECU, some sensors changed. New turn signals, 20 watt without reflector compared with earlier 10 watt. Belly pan redesigned. Stronger hand guards attached to end of handlebar. New adjustable windscreen design. Left handlebar switch incorporates flash-to-pass & emergency blinkers (EU models already had this). Stronger handlebars. Revised mirrors for less mirror breakage.

2005 (K5) Silver frame revised to black frame. Black rear frame covers vs previously fairing colour. New quiet clutch cover. Headlight interrupt when starting.

2007 (K7) New clear turn signal lenses and new swingarm pivot covers.

2013 (L3) Suzuki is introducing a 2014 model V-Strom 1000, based on the popular, and strong selling adventure bike category. A "Concept" bike was on display during the September 2012 Intermot Motorcycle Show.

References

External links 

 2014 Suzuki V-Strom 1000 - First Look
 Suzuki DL1000 V-STROM (2002-2008) review
 Suzuki DL1000 V-STROM (2014-on) review

V-Strom 1000
Dual-sport motorcycles
Motorcycles introduced in 2002